Lloydminster Airport  is located  northwest of Lloydminster, Alberta, Canada.

History

Built in 1981 at a cost of $6.3 million to replace the previous Lloydminster Airport, the new airport serves as the largest airport in the region. Despite the City of Lloydminster's status as a border city straddling the provincial border, the airport is located entirely within Alberta, whereas the old airport was entirely within Saskatchewan.

Airlines and destinations

References

External links

Place to Fly on COPA's Places to Fly airport directory

Certified airports in Alberta
Lloydminster